John David Rainey (born 1945) is a senior United States district judge of the United States District Court for the Southern District of Texas.

Education and career
Born in Freeport, Texas, Rainey received a Bachelor of Business Administration from Southern Methodist University in 1967 and was in the United States Army from 1969 to 1970. He then received a Juris Doctor from Southern Methodist University School of Law in 1972, entering in private practice in Dallas, Texas from 1973 to 1979, and in Angleton, Texas from 1979 to 1986. He was a director of the Angleton Chamber of Commerce from 1983 to 1987. He was a judge on the 149th District Court, Brazoria County, Texas from 1987 to 1990.

Federal judicial service
On January 24, 1990, Rainey was nominated by President George H. W. Bush to a seat on the United States District Court for the Southern District of Texas vacated by Judge Gabrielle Kirk McDonald. He was confirmed by the United States Senate on May 11, 1990, and received his commission on May 14, 1990. He assumed senior status on June 11, 2010.

References

Sources

1945 births
Living people
20th-century American judges
21st-century American judges
Dedman School of Law alumni
People from Freeport, Texas
Judges of the United States District Court for the Southern District of Texas
Southern Methodist University alumni
United States Army soldiers
United States district court judges appointed by George H. W. Bush